A polychotomy (päl′i kät′ə mē; plural polychotomies) is a division or separation into many parts or classes. Polychotomy is a generalization of dichotomy, which is a polychotomy of exactly two parts.  In evolutionary biology, the term polychotomy can also be considered a historically-based misspelling of polytomy.

See also
 Polychotomous key

References

External links

Examples of usage
Another Approach to Polychotomous Classification
Polyclass: polychotomous regression and multiple classification
The Development of a Hierarchical Polychotomous ADL-IADL Scale for Noninstitutionalized Elders
Probabilistic Forecasting - A Primer
Structured polychotomous machine diagnosis of multiple cancer types using gene expression

Biological concepts